The blue-eye cichlid (Cryptoheros spilurus) is a small species of fish in the family Cichlidae. It is native to Central America.

References

Heroini
Fish of Central America
Taxa named by Albert Günther
Fish described in 1862